Olof Gösta Anton Persson (born 5 May 1978) is a Swedish football manager and the current assistant coach of Malmö FF in Allsvenskan. Persson also played professionally as a central defender, most notably for Malmö FF. A full international between 2001 and 2006, he won four caps for the Sweden national team.

Club career 
Persson played in central defence and had considerable aerial power. He played the majority of his career at Swedish club Malmö FF, he reached around 350 matches for the club and won the 2004 Allsvenskan. This is also where the current sports chief in AGF, Brian Steen Nielsen, as a player met Persson. Persson left Malmö FF after clashing with his coach, Sören Åkeby, who, incidentally, is a former coach of AGF. In his season at FC Tirol, Persson was a part of a team that won the Austrian Bundesliga — shortly followed by the club's bankruptcy. When Persson arrived at AGF, he was hailed as the new master of a very fragile defence, but after a few weeks he ruptured his ligament and he was never able to play an official match for the club before he retired from professional football on 4 September 2008.

International career 
Persson represented the Sweden U17, U19, and U21 teams before making his full international debut on 1 February 2001 in a friendly game against Finland. He made two more international appearances in friendlies against Mexico and the Czech Republic in 2005 before winning his fourth and ultimately last international cap in a friendly against Jordan on 23 January 2006.

Honours
FC Tirol
 Austrian Football Bundesliga: 2002

Malmö FF
 Allsvenskan: 2004

References

External links
 
 Malmö FF profile 
 Career stats at Danmarks Radio

1978 births
Living people
Swedish footballers
Footballers from Malmö
Association football central defenders
Sweden international footballers
Allsvenskan players
Superettan players
Austrian Football Bundesliga players
Danish Superliga players
Malmö FF players
FC Tirol Innsbruck players
Aarhus Gymnastikforening players
Swedish football managers
Malmö FF non-playing staff
FC Rosengård 1917 managers
Swedish expatriate footballers
Swedish expatriate sportspeople in Austria
Expatriate footballers in Austria
Swedish expatriate sportspeople in Denmark
Expatriate men's footballers in Denmark